Vicente Piera Pañella (11 June 1903 in Barcelona – 14 June 1960), known by the nickname "La Bruja" ("The Witch"), is a former Spanish footballer who spent most of his career at FC Barcelona.

Club career
Born in Barcelona, Piera began to play for Centre d'Esports de Sants. Piera was one of the best right wings in the history of FC Barcelona, where he played from 1920 to 1921 season to 1932–33 season and appeared in 395 games, scored 123 goals. He also represented Spain at the 1924 Summer Olympics.

International career
Piera never reached the Spain national football team, but he played for the Catalonia national football team, and was part of the team that won two tournaments of the Prince of Asturias Cup in the 1920s, winning the inter-regional competition in 1923-24 and in 1926. Piera scored two goals in the infamous final of the 1923-24 edition against a Castile/Madrid XI, the first in a 4-4 draw and the second two days later in the replay, netting the winner in a 3-2 victory that saw Catalonia lift their second Prince of Asturias Cup trophy.

Honours

Club
FC Barcelona

La Liga (1): 1928–29
Copa del Rey (4): 1922, 1925, 1926 and 1928

International
Catalan XI

Prince of Asturias Cup: 1923-24 and 1926

References

External links
 
 Piera at www.fcbarcelona.com
 Spain stats
 

1903 births
1960 deaths
Spanish footballers
Spain international footballers
Olympic footballers of Spain
Footballers at the 1924 Summer Olympics
La Liga players
FC Barcelona players
Footballers from Barcelona
Association football forwards
Catalonia international footballers